Anushirwan Khan (Anūshīrvān Khān) occupied the Ilkhanid throne from 1344 until his death in 1357. He was a puppet of the Chobanid ruler Malek Ashraf and possessed no power of his own. He is notable for being the last of the Ilkhan dynasty to have coins struck in his name.

Anushirwan's origins are obscure. One account suggests that Malek Ashraf's wardrobe keeper, a certain Nushirvan, was raised to the throne and given the name Anushirvan, after the famous Sasanian king Khosrow I Anushirvan. The Chobanids struck coins in his name until 1357.

References

Sources
 
 
 

1357 deaths
Il-Khan emperors
14th-century monarchs in Asia
Year of birth unknown